The Metros were an English five-piece indie/punk band from Peckham, South London. Founded by vocalist Saul Adamczewski and lead guitarist Jak Payne, the band was formed while most of the members were still at school.

Their song 'sexual riot' also featured in Season 2 Episode 12: "It's a Wonderful Lie" of Gossip Girl.

Background
The Metros dubbed themselves a 'punk and roll' band and were from a musical background—Adamczewski's father designed record sleeves for A&M and Payne's father played session bass for Glenn Tilbrook. After recording a 5 track demo over two days in March 2006 in Honor Oak Park London with The Mysterious Hand, the band worked with Baxter Dury and were signed to 1965 Records by James Endeacott (who had previously signed The Libertines, The Strokes and The View). When all five members were still under 18.  The Guardian described them as "Punk'n'roll urchins".

Formerly known as Eastern Bloc and The Wanking Skankers, they list Squeeze, Ian Dury and Beastie Boys as their major influences.

Their debut single, "Education Pt. 2", was released on 17 March 2008.  Their second single, "Last of the Lookers", was released on 2 June 2008.

Live music

In summer 2007, The Metros played at T in the Park, Bestival, the Hackney Underage Festival, The Great Escape in Brighton, the Skegness Big Reunion Festival, and the BBC Electric Proms.  They were booked to support The Coral, but were replaced after throwing a glass bottle into the crowd at the first gig, which smashed on and injured a girl spectator.

They Performed live on the first episode of the BBC Three TV show Lilly Allen And Friends in 2008 after winning the vote to perform over other bands in the “Best Young New Music” category.

The band supported Madness at a special gig in aid of The Teenage Cancer Trust on 3 April 2008, at the Royal Albert Hall.

They played the Radio 1/NME Stage at the 2008 Reading and Leeds festivals.

In late 2008, the band were forced to cancel four gigs in Japan after vocalist Saul Adamczewski fell ill.

On 17 June 2009 The Metros announced they were splitting up with two farewell shows, with lead singer Saul saying "The Metros are going their separate ways" 

Saul has since been playing in Fat White Family, a band with a very different style altogether.

Discography

Singles
"Education Pt. 2" (17 March 2008, 1965 Records)
"Last of the Lookers" (2 June 2008, 1965 Records) UK No. 102
"Talk About It" (8 September 2008, 1965 Records)

Album
More Money Less Grief (15 September 2008, 1965 Records) UK No. 116

References

External links
 Official Website
 The Metros on Columbia Records
 The Metros on MySpace
 1965 Records

People from Peckham
English rock music groups
English punk rock groups